Chinaza Uche is a Scottish-born actor based in the United States. He is known for his series regular role in the Apple TV series Dickinson.

Early life
Born in Edinburgh  with Nigerian heritage, Uche attended the New York University Tisch School of the Arts.

Career
In 2018 he appeared in the lead role of Pius in the film  Nigerian  Prince which had its world premiere at the Tribeca Film Festival in April 2018, and closed the Africa International Film Festival in Lagos in November 2018.

Uche has many off-broadway credits including at the Manhattan Theatre Club, New York Theatre Workshop, Classic Stage Company, and the National Black Theatre.

Uche appeared as a series-regular role as Henry opposite Hailee Steinfeld in Apple TV+ comedy series Dickinson. He also had roles in television series such as Fear the Walking Dead, Little America, and The Blacklist. In October 2021 he was announced to be joining the Zach Braff project A Good Person alongside Florence Pugh and Morgan Freeman. In November 2021 he joined the cast of Apple TV+ thriller series Silo (originally with the working title Wool).

Selected filmography

References

External links

Living people
People of Nigerian descent
Black British male actors
British expatriate male actors in the United States
British male stage actors
21st-century British male actors
Tisch School of the Arts alumni